The Swedish ethyl acetate method (SweEt) is a method for chemical analysis of pesticide residues in food using ethyl acetate as an extraction medium followed by analysis with liquid chromatography-tandem mass spectrometry (LC-MS/MS) and gas chromatography-tandem mass spectrometry (GC-MS/MS). It was developed by the Swedish National Food Agency (National Reference Laboratory for pesticide analysis) for quantitative analysis of over 500 pesticides in fruits, vegetables, cereals and products of animal origin.

References

Analytical chemistry